Big Bluegrass Special is the debut album by American singer-guitarist Glen Campbell and the Green River Boys, released in 1962 by Capitol Records.

Track listing
Side 1
 "Truck Driving Man" (Terry Fell) – 2:00
 "There's More Pretty Girls Than One" (Alton Delmore, Arthur Smith) – 2:55
 "Weary Lonesome Blues" (Delmore) – 2:15
 "No Vacancy" (Merle Travis, Cliffie Stone) – 2:20
 "Rainin' on the Mountain" (Delmore) – 2:22
 "Kentucky Means Paradise" (Travis) – 2:35

Side 2
 "Brown's Ferry Blues" (Delmore) – 2:33
 "Lonesome Jailhouse Blues" (Delmore, Rabon Delmore) – 1:32
 "One Hundred Miles Away from Home" (Jerry Capehart, Glen Campbell, Nick Venet) – 3:10
 "This Old White Mule of Mine" (Bob Nolan) – 2:00
 "Poor Boy Lookin' for A Home" (Melvin Schmidt) – 2:10
 "Long Black Limousine" (Vern Stovall, Bobby George) – 3:00

Personnel
 Glen Campbell – vocals, acoustic guitar
The Green River Boys
 Carl Tanberg – bass
 Dale Fitzsimmons – banjo
 James Burton – acoustic guitar
 David Frost – drums

Production
 Nick Venet – producer
 Karen Cronin - art direction, design
 Jerry White – cover photography
 John Johnson – producer (re-issue)
 Glenn Meadows – remastering at Masterfonics, Nashville, TN

Charts
Album - Billboard (United States)
Big Bluegrass Special did not chart.

Singles - Billboard (United States)

Release history
The 1996 CD reissue of Big Bluegrass Special included the bonus tracks "Divorce Me C.O.D" and "Dark As A Dungeon".

References

Glen Campbell albums
1962 debut albums
Capitol Records albums
Albums produced by Nick Venet
Albums recorded at Capitol Studios